Epitonium minorum is a species of small predatory sea snail,  a marine gastropod mollusc in the family Epitoniidae, the wentletraps. It occurs in North Island, New Zealand and in Australia.

References
 Powell A. W. B., New Zealand Mollusca, William Collins Publishers Ltd, Auckland, New Zealand 1979 

Epitoniidae
Gastropods of Australia
Gastropods of New Zealand
Gastropods described in 1936